Bloody Sunday was an event which took place in London, England on 13 November 1887, when a crowd of marchers protesting about unemployment and the Irish Coercion Acts, as well as demanding the release of MP William O'Brien, clashed with the Metropolitan Police. The demonstration was organised by the Social Democratic Federation and the Irish National League. Violent clashes took place between the police and demonstrators, many "armed with iron bars, knives, pokers and gas pipes". A contemporary report noted that 400 were arrested and 75 persons were badly injured, including many police, two policemen being stabbed and one protester bayonetted.

Background

Gladstone's espousal of the cause of Irish home rule had split the Liberal Party and made it easy for the Conservatives to gain a majority in the House of Commons. The period from 1885 to 1906 was one of Tory dominance, with short intermissions. Coercion Acts were the answer of British governments perturbed by rural unrest in Ireland, and they involved various degrees of suspension of civil rights. Although one purpose of the 13 November demonstration was to protest about the handling of the Irish situation by the Conservative government of Lord Salisbury, it had a much wider context.

The Long Depression, starting in 1873 and lasting almost to the end of the century, created difficult social conditions in Britain—similar to the economic problems that drove rural agitation in Ireland. Falling food prices created rural unemployment, which resulted in both emigration and internal migration. Workers moved to the towns and cities in thousands, eroding employment, wages and working conditions. By November 1887, unemployed workers' demonstrations from the East End of London had been building up for more than two years. There had already been clashes with the police and with the members of upper class clubs. Trafalgar Square was seen symbolically as the point at which the working-class East End met the upper-class West End of London, a focus of class struggle and an obvious flashpoint.

This attracted the attention of the small but growing socialist movement – the Marxists of both the Social Democratic Federation (SDF) and Socialist League, and the reformist socialists of the Fabian Society. Police and government attempts to suppress or divert the demonstrations also brought in the radical wing of the Liberal Party and free speech activists from the National Secular Society.

The working class in British cities contained many people of Irish birth or origin. London, like industrial areas of northern England and western Scotland, had a large Irish working class, concentrated in the East End, where it rubbed shoulders with a diverse population, including increasing numbers of Jews from Eastern Europe.

Demonstration of 13 November

Some 30,000 people, "mostly respectable spectators", encircled Trafalgar Square as at least 10,000 protesters marched in from several different directions, led by (among others) Elizabeth Reynolds, John Burns, William Morris, Annie Besant and Robert Cunninghame-Graham, who were primarily leaders of the Social Democratic Federation. Also marching were the Fabian playwright George Bernard Shaw, Eleanor Marx, and Charlotte Wilson.

There were approximately 14,000 police officers for 5.5 million Londoners.
Two thousand police and 400 troops were deployed to halt the demonstration. Burns and Cunninghame-Graham were arrested and imprisoned for six weeks. Annie Besant, who was a Marxist, Fabian and secularist, spoke at the rally and offered herself for arrest, but the police declined to do so. Of the 400 arrested, 50 were detained in custody.

At some point James Compton Merryweather, head of the firm Merryweather & Sons, and a Conservative supporter, offered to use a 400-gallons-per-minute steam fire engine as a water cannon of the day to clear the rioters from Trafalgar Square. However the Commissioner of the Metropolitan Police, Sir Charles Warren, declined.

In the fighting, many rioters were injured by police truncheons and under the hooves of police horses. The British Army dispatched a force of 400 men, consisting of both infantry and cavalry. Although the infantry were marched into position with bayonets fixed, they were not ordered to open fire and the cavalry were not ordered to draw their swords. An Australian newspaper, of conservative political orientation, reported that the wounds received by the mob were less severe than those of the constables.

Aftermath
The following Sunday, 20 November, saw another demonstration and more casualties. According to a report in the partisan Socialist Review, among them was a young clerk named Alfred Linnell, who was run down by a police horse, dying in hospital a fortnight later from complications of a shattered thigh.

The funeral of Linnell on 18 December provided another focus for the unemployed and Irish movements. William Morris, leader of the Socialist League, gave the main speech and "advocated a holy war to prevent London from being turned into a huge prison". A smaller but similar event marked the burial of another of those killed, W. B. Curner, which took place in January. The release of those imprisoned was celebrated on 20 February 1888, with a large public meeting. Henry Hyndman, leader of the SDF, violently denounced the Liberal Party and the Radical MPs who were present.

See also
Belgian strikes of 1886

References

Bibliography
 Thompson, E. P. William Morris: Romantic to Revolutionary, Merlin Press, London, 1977
 Taylor, Anne. Annie Besant: A Biography, Oxford University Press, 1991 (also US edition 1992) 

1887 in London
1887 in the United Kingdom
History of Ireland (1801–1923)
Riots in London
Social Democratic Federation
1880s riots
Metropolitan Police operations